Benjamin H. Snyder House is a historic home located near Martinsburg, Berkeley County, West Virginia. It was built about 1925, and is a -story, Arts and Crafts-style bungalow.  It is built of concrete with weather board finished gables and the remainder finished in stucco.  The front facade features a recessed, arcaded front porch.  Also on the property are a concrete block garage (c. 1925), retaining wall (c. 1925), and a concrete obelisk memorializing an 18th-century ford of Opequon Creek known as an Old Pack Horse Ford (c. 1940).

It was listed on the National Register of Historic Places in 2004.

References

Houses on the National Register of Historic Places in West Virginia
Bungalow architecture in West Virginia
Houses completed in 1925
Houses in Berkeley County, West Virginia
National Register of Historic Places in Martinsburg, West Virginia